KULR-TV (channel 8) is a television station in Billings, Montana, United States, affiliated with NBC and owned by the Cowles Company. The station's studios are located on Overland Avenue in the Homestead Business Park section of Billings, and its transmitter is located on Coburn Hill southeast of downtown.

KYUS-TV (channel 3) in Miles City operates as a full-time satellite of KULR, covering areas of east-central Montana; this station's transmitter is located northwest of Miles City. KYUS is owned by The Marks Group, which also owns several radio stations in Montana, among other broadcasting properties. Cowles operates the station under a time brokerage agreement (TBA). KYUS is a straight simulcast of KULR; on-air references to KYUS are limited to Federal Communications Commission (FCC)-mandated hourly station identifications during newscasts and other programming. Aside from the transmitter, KYUS does not maintain any physical presence locally in Miles City. At one point known as the smallest network affiliate in the country, KYUS has largely served as a satellite of other stations since 1984, and has simulcast KULR since 1998. Marks Radio Group also owns KXGN-TV in Glendive, which broadcasts KULR's newscasts on a digital subchannel.

History

KULR-TV
Channel 8's first broadcast was on March 15, 1958, as KGHL-TV, an NBC affiliate owned by Midland Empire Broadcasting Company along with KGHL radio (AM 790). The station's first studios were co-located with KGHL radio on North 30th Street in Billings. Midland Empire Broadcasting sold KGHL-AM-TV to Crain-Snyder Television in 1962; Crain-Snyder immediately spun KGHL radio off to George C. Hatch, retaining KGHL-TV. The following year, the new owners changed the station's call letters to KULR-TV, which were a play on the word "color" as most programs in the mid-1960s started changing from being televised in black and white to color. During this time, most on-air verbal references to the station called it "Color 8." KULR also added a secondary affiliation with ABC in 1963. In the late 1960s, the station moved its studios to a new building adjacent to the transmitter on Coburn Road, southeast of downtown Billings. Chicago-based Harriscope Broadcasting purchased the station in 1967 for $350,000.

Harriscope agreed in 1967 to change the primary network affiliation for KULR-TV and KFBB-TV in Great Falls to ABC at the end of each station's existing affiliation contract; KULR's switch took effect January 1, 1969, at which point NBC was relegated to secondary status. Channel 8 then became the fourth primary ABC affiliate in Montana. This was very unusual for a two-station market, especially one as small as Billings. NBC wouldn't return to Billings on a full-time basis until KOUS-TV (channel 4, now KHMT), which signed on in 1980, became a primary NBC affiliate in 1982. From 1970 until KUSM in Bozeman (now part of Montana PBS) signed on in 1984, KULR aired some PBS programming, as Montana was one of the few states at the time that did not have a PBS member station of its own.

In spring 1981, KULR dumped the "Color 8" branding and became known as "Straight 8." During this time, its local newscast, Straight 8 Newsservice, featured anchor Dave Rye, sports director Larry Gebert, and weather forecaster Kit Carson. Other on-air reporters and weekend anchors at the time included Joni Earle, Monica Gayle, Kyle Safely, and David Smock. The station announced in September 1983 that it would build new studios on Overland Avenue in Billings; KULR completed the move in 1984.

Harriscope sold KULR-TV and KTWO-TV in Casper, Wyoming to Dix Communications in 1986 for $12.2 million. In 1987, NBC wanted a stronger affiliate in the market, and quickly negotiated a return to KULR; the switch took effect that August.

Dix Communications sold KULR-TV, along with KFBB-TV in Great Falls, to Max Media on June 16, 2004, for $12.25 million. Dix chairman Robert Dix said that the sale made sense, as KULR and KFBB were the company's last two television stations. On September 30, 2013, the Cowles Company announced that it would acquire Max Media's Montana television station cluster (comprising KULR and ABC affiliates KWYB in Butte, KFBB-TV in Great Falls, KHBB-LD in Helena and KTMF in Missoula) for $18 million. The sale was completed on November 29.

KYUS-TV
KYUS-TV went on the air August 29, 1969, under the ownership of Custer Broadcasting Corporation. Originally an independent station, it joined NBC in 1970. In its early years, KYUS was known as the smallest network affiliate in America. The station's principal owner, David Rivenes, did the news, sports, weather and reporting himself — he was also featured in the late-1970s on NBC's Real People and in TV Guide for his career. He also hosted much of the station's other local programming (which comprised up to five hours of the KYUS schedule) along with his wife, Ella; in a 1980 interview with Sports Illustrated, Rivenes said that the local programs, which were broadcast in lieu of acquiring syndicated programming, were "what the FCC wants: real public service television." During the station's early years, KYUS did not turn a profit, and was supported by Rivenes' title insurance business. In 1984, the Riveneses sold KYUS to the owners of KOUS-TV for $200,000; at that point, channel 3 became a satellite of KOUS and the station's local programming was discontinued. KYUS, along with KOUS, switched to ABC in 1987. After KOUS shut down and moved its programming to KSVI (channel 6) in 1993, KYUS became a satellite of KSVI.

As a satellite of KOUS-TV and KSVI, KYUS-TV was on the verge of closure several times, as the station generated insufficient revenue to cover its costs. In addition, the station's owner, Big Horn Communications, had difficulties listing KYUS for sale due to the size and location of Miles City; one media brokerage company, Blackburn & Company, said it was "economically impossible" for KYUS to operate as a standalone station. Ultimately, Big Horn sold the station to Stephen Marks in 1995. Marks originally proposed to operate KYUS as a satellite of KXGN-TV, his CBS and NBC affiliate in Glendive. However, in 1996, KYUS became a Fox affiliate; by 1997, channel 3 had also added secondary affiliations with UPN and The WB. After two years with Fox, KYUS-TV became a satellite of KULR-TV under a time brokerage agreement on May 1, 1998. The original agreement expired after ten years; KYUS-TV now broadcasts KULR-TV's programming under a series of informal agreements, receiving no payment and keeping no advertising income. Although the station generates no revenue of its own, Marks continues to operate it as a public service.

News operation
In 2009, KULR began broadcasting its local newscasts in widescreen standard definition. KULR became the first television station in Montana to switch to full HD news operation during its 5 p.m. newscast on August 27, 2012. Studio cameras are currently still in 16:9 standard definition, however.

Since KULR's purchase by Cowles Publishing Company, the station adopted the "Right Now" branding and other elements standardized with its flagship station, KHQ-TV in Spokane (replacing its prior use of graphics used by the NBC Owned Television Stations). In October 2022, its newscasts were rebranded as NonStop Local, as part of a group-wide rebranding by Cowles.

Notable former on-air staff
 Conrad Burns – farm reporter (former United States Senator from Montana)
 Monica Gayle – weekend anchor/reporter (former CBS News correspondent; now weeknight anchor at WJBK in Detroit)

Technical information

Subchannels
The stations' digital signals are multiplexed:

In February 2009, KULR, KTVQ and two other stations in the Billings market were refused FCC permission to end analog broadcasts and operate as digital-only effective on the originally-scheduled February 17, 2009, date.

KYUS began broadcasting in high definition in February 2018.

Translators

References

External links

NBC network affiliates
Cowles Company
Television channels and stations established in 1958
1958 establishments in Montana
ULR-TV